Glenn Martin, DDS is a stop-motion adult animated sitcom that premiered on Nick at Nite on August 17, 2009. The series was produced by Tornante Animation and Cuppa Coffee Studios, in association with Rogers Communications.  Glenn Martin, DDS was Nick at Nite's fourth original series (after Hi Honey, I'm Home!,  Fatherhood and Hi-Jinks).

One of the show's creators was Eric Fogel, who had success creating the MTV claymation series Celebrity Deathmatch.

The show premiered in Canada on October 3, 2009 on Citytv, and March 18, 2010 on Sky One in the UK and Ireland. Season two premiered on June 11, 2010. The show ended on November 7, 2011.

Overview
After accidentally burning down his house in Freeland, Pennsylvania, loving father and dentist Glenn Martin, DDS takes his family — his beautiful wife Jackie, their hormone-addled 13-year-old son Conor, their power suit-wearing 11-year-old daughter Courtney, Courtney's overachieving assistant Wendy, and Canine (the family's dog who has an oversized anus, which Glenn in the opening sequence calls a heart) — on a cross-country road trip in order to strengthen their family bond together.

Cast and characters
Kevin Nealon as Dr. Glenn Campbell Martin, an optimistic travelling dentist who dreams of becoming closer with his family. He is a Doctor of Dental Surgery.
Catherine O'Hara as Jackie Robinson Martin, Glenn's wife and the mother of Conor and Courtney. She is often stressed with the problems involved in raising a family in an RV.
Peter Oldring as Conor Martin, the thirteen-year-old son of the Martins. He is going through puberty and is hormonal. He also tends to be the subject of pratfalls due to his clumsiness. He also has a crush on Wendy, but always gets rejected.
Jackie Clarke as Courtney Martin, the eleven-year-old daughter of the Martins, who acts like an adult business woman. She is competitive, outspoken and boastful.
Judy Greer as Wendy Park (real name Bon Wa-Fo) is Courtney's assistant and employee. She was born in North Korea. Her age is unclear; Glenn has referred to her as a tweenager, but she later claims to be thirteen years old. 
Canine, the Martins' dog who has an oversized anus.

Development
Former Paramount and Disney chief executive Michael Eisner, who put up his own money to produce the pilot episode, pitched it to Nick at Nite rather than ABC. Eisner was quoted as saying the decision was based on Nick at Nite's record of nurturing shows.

The show has a 1970s sensibility including the design of the Winnebago which is driven across the country.  It was reportedly inspired by the 1971 ABC made-for-TV movie In Search of America, which starred Jeff Bridges as a college dropout who drove a Winnebago across the country with his family.

Laugh track
Unusual for a modern animated sitcom, the show featured a laugh track in early episodes intended to mimic 1970s sitcoms. This was later removed at the request of the series' creators, with Eric Fogel citing the show having "too much internal thinking". Part of the criticism was leveled at the overuse of laugh tracks (which were permanently removed a month after the show's premiere). Mike Hale of The New York Times wrote: "Glenn Martin, DDS is pretty much laugh–free (though it does have a laugh track)".

The Hollywood Reporter wrote: "Ignore the stilted jokes [and] the limp characterization. [...] Just understand this: Martin is an animated show with a laugh track. Imagination comes in handy, though, in trying to figure out how someone approved this concept, labored on this and then let it free into the world."

Awards and nominations
In December 2009, the show was nominated for an Annie Award for Best Animated Television Production.

In November 2010, the show won two Gemini Awards for Best Animated Series and Best Direction for an Animated Series (Cuppa Coffee/Ken Cunningham for "The Tooth Will Set You Free").

Episodes

Critical reception
Glenn Martin, DDS received mixed to negative reviews from critics, garnering a 48/100  from Metacritic based on 9 reviews after the series premiere. Variety wrote: "Despite the contributions of Eric Fogel (MTV's Celebrity Deathmatch), Glenn Martin isn't as bad as visiting the dentist, but isn't much better than sitting in the waiting room. Positioned as a spoof of classic sitcoms, Glenn Martin gets off to a bad start by incorporating a laugh track, which only highlights some of the deficiencies in the writing."

The Los Angeles Times wrote: "Still, except for the dog's hindquarters, I like the look of it. (Eric Fogel of MTV's Celebrity Deathmatch oversees the animation.) Press materials indicate that the Martins will be visiting Las Vegas, Yellowstone, the Mall of America and Hollywood in future adventures, and as a fan of the form, I'm interested to see what the animators make of them."

New York Daily News writer David Hinkley gave the show 4 out of 5 stars, calling it "satire with biting wit".

The Boston Globe called it "cute, giggle-worthy, and only a smidgen dangerous".

The Detroit News wrote that the show is "full of enough end-of-the week laughs to help you giggle yourself into the weekend".

Website Shakefire.com rated the show an "A−".

Controversy
In November 2009, Maura Buete, a Florida mother, was outraged that the series contained sexual references despite airing in an 8 p.m. weekday slot, immediately following the children's show SpongeBob SquarePants. In response to several complaints from parents, Nickelodeon (whose spokesman David Bittler had stated complaints were minimal) moved the show to Friday nights at 10:30 p.m.

References

Notes

External links
 

2009 American television series debuts
2009 Canadian television series debuts
2011 American television series endings
2011 Canadian television series endings
2000s American adult animated television series
2010s American adult animated television series
2000s American satirical television series
2010s American satirical television series
2000s American sitcoms
2010s American sitcoms
2000s Canadian adult animated television series
2010s Canadian adult animated television series
2000s Canadian satirical television series
2010s Canadian satirical television series
2000s Canadian sitcoms
2010s Canadian sitcoms
American adult animated comedy television series
American stop-motion adult animated television series
Animated satirical television series
Animated television series about dysfunctional families
Canadian adult animated comedy television series
Canadian stop-motion adult animated television series
English-language television shows
Nick at Nite original programming
Citytv original programming
Sky UK original programming
Animation controversies in television
Television controversies in the United States
Television controversies in Canada
Television series about vacationing
Television series created by Eric Fogel
Television series by The Tornante Company
Television series by Cuppa Coffee Studios
Television shows filmed in Toronto
Television shows filmed in California
American animated sitcoms
Canadian animated sitcoms